The men's 4 × 200 metres relay at the 2014 IAAF World Relays was held at the Thomas Robinson Stadium on 24 May.

The rarity of this event at the elite level was evidenced by the poor handoffs.  Apparently the athletes involved didn't know their exchange zones.  Jermaine Brown came to a complete stop in the zone, and received the handoff from Warren Weir as he was being passed.  Even with this ugly handoff, the Jamaican team still dominated the race and set a new world record.  Their closest competitor was St. Kitts and Nevis, whose flaw had less of an effect on their performance, Brijesh Lawrence running on the inside of the turn, correctly put out his right hand to receive the baton, but incoming Lestrod Roland also had the baton in his right hand and had to make the handoff awkwardly across his body.  For the American team, Ameer Webb looked completely confused, starting late, running out of his lane to the inside, then reaching to receive the baton before he had even entered the passing zone.  Curtis Mitchell was not ready to pass that early and was moving too fast to make the exchange.  Mitchell just stopped in frustration, the baton bouncing two lanes away, retrieved by Webb outside of the zone for a disqualification.

Records
Prior to the competition, the records were as follows:

Schedule

Results

Heats

Qualification: First 3 of each heat (Q) plus the 2 fastest times (q) advanced to the final.

Final

References

4 x 200 metres relay
4 × 200 metres relay